Strike Gently is the second and final studio album by New York City band The Virgins. The album was released on 12 March 2013 on Cult Records.

Track listing

Recording
"The 10 track album was recorded at the East Village Recording Center by Johnny T Yerington and Gus Oberg as Unicorn Parade. All art direction by Warren Fu and cover photo by Frank Fu."

Personnel
 Donald Cumming – lead vocals
 Xan Aird – lead guitar, backing vocals
 Max Kamins – bass, backing vocals
 John Eatherly – drums, percussion

References

2013 albums
The Virgins albums
Cult Records albums